Dankook University (commonly referred to as Dankook), abbreviated as DU or DKU, is a prestigious private research university in Yongin and Cheonan, South Korea. The university was established in 1947. It was the first university established after the National Liberation Day of Korea, and its original location was in Jongno District and Yongsan District (after Jongno), Seoul.

Dankook University was ranked 148th in Asia by QS Asian Universities Ranking in 2010.

Academics
Dankook University has a global affiliate network of universities and institutes.

 Study abroad programs at sister universities allow students to improve their language skills. Dankook University gives financial support and several academic credits.
 Short-term visiting programs provide faculty, staff and students with opportunities to expose themselves to global standards.
 International summer/winter schools are designed to welcome students from sister universities and non-affiliated institutions.
 Global Talent Network is a student organization that consists of Korean and international students. It seeks to promote mutual cooperation.

There is an extension campus in Cheonan, a city in South Chungcheong province. The Cheonan campus includes the largest hospital in the region and one of Korea's top dental programs, as well as the only four-year Mongolian Language and Literature Department in Korea.

The university hosts a student body of about 20,000 and employs an instructional faculty of about 630.

Global Dankook and mascot

Dankook University's mascot is the bear. Each campus has a bronze bear statue.

As mentioned above, Dankook University was the first private university established after Korea gained independence in 1947. The university now features 20 undergraduate colleges and 10 professional graduate schools divided between its new Jukjeon campus, constructed in 2007, and its Cheonan campus.

Both campuses have international exchange programs and are home to foreign students and faculty from countries such as the United States, China and the United Kingdom.

The international presence at Dankook continues to grow thanks to its collaborative relationships with more than 90 universities from 30 countries, including Stockholm University in Sweden; California State University and Ohio Northern University in the USA; and La Trobe University in Australia. These relationships have fostered international summer schools programs, student exchanges, and short-term visits.

History

The foundation of Dankook University was approved on November 1, 1947, its opening taking place at Nakwon-dong, Jongno-gu, Seoul, on November 3. In 1967 the Seok Juseon museum opened based on a donation of over 3,000 items by Seok Ju-Seon. The museum curates and conserves Korean costumes.

Academics
The university holds international symposiums, publishes academic journals, and manages 22 research bodies such as the Oriental Study Research Institute, the Information Display Research Institute, the Buried Cultural Property Research Institute, the Special Education Research Institute, the Medical Laser Research Institute etc. It has 20 affiliates and affiliated education organizations such as the Seokjuseon Museum and the Information and Communication Center.

DU was selected as the best institute in 10 fields for the general university evaluations of 1999.

Jukjeon Campus

 College of Humanitites
 College of Law
 College of Liberal Arts
 College of Music and Arts
 College of Social Science
 College of Business & Economics
 College of Engineering
 College of Software Convergence
 College of Education

Cheonan Campus
 College of Foreign Languages
 College of Science & Technology
 College of Biotechnology & Bioenginerring
 College of Art
 College of Sport Science
 College of Medicine
 College of Health & Welfare
 College of Nursing
 College of Dentistry 

The graduate schools were opened in 1958. Twelve graduate schools are managed in 65 departments for the master's course and 51 departments for the doctor's course and the Business Graduate School, the Juridical Affairs and Administration Graduate School, the Education Graduate School, the Design Graduate School, the Information and Communication Graduate School, the Special Education Graduate School, the Mass Culture and Art Graduate School, the TESOL Graduate School, the Real EstateㆍConstruction Graduate School, and the Policy Management Graduate School, the Sports Science Graduate School and the Health and Welfare Graduate School, on Jukjeon Campus.

Notable alumni
Ahn Suk-hwan
Bada (S.E.S)
Choi Yoon-young
Choi Young-won (Apeace)
Choo Ja-hyun
Danny Ahn (g.o.d)
Eru
Go Se-won
Ha Ji-won
In Gyo-jin
Jae Hee
Jang Hyuk
Jang Ki-bum
Jay Park
Jay Kim (Daud Kim)
Ji Chang-wook
Jo Hyun-jae
Cho Seung-woo
Kim Da-hyun
Kim Dong-ho
Kim Hye-sun
Kim Hyun-joo
Kim Hyung-jun (SS501)
Kim Ji-woo
Kim Jong-kook (Turbo)
Kim Joon-ho
Kim Min-hee
Kim Min-seo
Kim Roi-ha
Kim Ye-ryeong
Kim Yoon-seo
Kwak Si-yang
Kwon Hyun-sang
Lee Byung-joon
Lee Byung-kyu
Lee Chae-young
Lee Ha-na
Lee Jong-won
Lee Joon-hyuk
Lee Ki-woo
Lee Min-hyuk (BtoB)
Lee Min-young
Lee So-jung (Ladies' Code)
Lee Yo-won
Moon Hee-kyung
Na In-woo
Naul (Brown Eyed Soul)
N (VIXX)
Oh Hyun-kyung
Seung-hwan Oh
Oh Yeon-soo
Park Bo-young
Park Jung-min (SS501)
Park Hae-soo
Park Tae-hwan
Rain
Shin Eun-kyung
Shin Jae-ha
Son Tae-jin
Ok Taec-yeon (2PM)
T.O.P (Big Bang)
Woo Do-hwan 
Yoo Ji-tae
Yoo Yeon-jung (Cosmic Girls)
Yoon Chan
Yoon Yo-seop

Dankook University Hospital
Dankook University Hospital (DKUH) opened in April 1994 to improve regional health. It has 1300 medical and other staff.

DKUH is the largest general hospital in Chung Nam Province, South Korea, with 900 patient beds and 33 specialty clinics including Internal medicine, Surgery, Ophthalmology, ENT (Ear, Nose and Throat), Physical Medicine and Rehabilitation (PM&R), and Diagnostic Radiology. DKUH is active in medical research with the Medical Laser Research Center, Life Science Research Institute, Gastrointestinal Research Unit and Biotechnology Research Institute.

See also
List of colleges and universities in South Korea
Education in South Korea

References

External links

Official school website, in English
Official school website, in Chinese
Official school website, in Korean

 
Universities and colleges in Gyeonggi Province
Universities and colleges in South Chungcheong Province
Yongin
Cheonan
1947 establishments in South Korea
Educational institutions established in 1947
Private universities and colleges in South Korea